This is a list of members of the 14th Legislative Assembly of Queensland from 1902 to 1904, as elected at the 1902 state election held on 11 March 1902.

While only the Australian Labor Federation stood as a party, the fall of Philp's government and the rise of prominent Liberal Arthur Morgan in 1903 produced a realignment of non-Labour MLAs into liberal and conservative groupings.

See also
1902 Queensland state election
Premier:
 Robert Philp (Ministerial) (1899–1903)
 Arthur Morgan (Liberal) (1903–1906)

Notes
  On 16 June 1902, Charles Hastings Barton, the newly elected Labour member for Maryborough, died before taking his seat. Ministerial candidate Henry Garde won the resulting by-election on 3 July 1902.
  On 18 June 1902, Samuel Grimes, the Ministerial member for Oxley, died. Ministerial candidate Digby Denham won the resulting by-election on 3 July 1902.
  On 11 December 1902, Thomas Murray-Prior, the Opposition member for Fassifern, died. Opposition candidate Charles Moffatt Jenkinson won the resulting by-election on 13 January 1903.
  On 4 March 1903, William O'Connell, the Ministerial member for Musgrave, died. Ministerial candidate John White won the resulting by-election on 4 April 1903.
  On 16 September 1903, Francis Kates, the Ministerial member for Cunningham, died. Ministerial candidate Duncan Watson won the resulting by-election on 29 October 1903.

References

 Waterson, Duncan Bruce: Biographical Register of the Queensland Parliament 1860-1929 (second edition), Sydney 2001.
 
 
 

Members of Queensland parliaments by term
20th-century Australian politicians